Abram Bergson (born Abram Burk, April 21, 1914 in Baltimore, Maryland – April 23, 2003 in Cambridge, Massachusetts) was an American economist, academician, and professor in the Harvard Economics Department since 1956.

Early life and education 
He graduated with an A.B. degree from Johns Hopkins University in 1933 and his A.M. and Ph.D. from Harvard University in 1935 and 1940, respectively.

Career 
In a 1938 paper Bergson defined and discussed the notion of an individualistic social welfare function.  The paper delineated necessary marginal conditions for economic efficiency,  relative to:
 real-valued ordinal utility functions of individuals (illustrated by indifference-curve maps) for commodities 
 labor supplied
 other resource constraints.

In so doing, it showed how welfare economics could dispense with interpersonally-comparable cardinal utility (say measured by money income), either individually or in the aggregate, with no loss of behavioral significance.

Bergson was chief of the Russian Economic subdivision of the Office of Strategic Services during World War II.  After the war he taught at Columbia University and Harvard University. He was elected a Fellow of the American Academy of Arts and Sciences in 1963. From 1964, he was director of the Harvard Russian Research Center and became chairman of the Social Sciences Advisory Board of the U.S. Arms Control and Disarmament Agency. He was elected to the American Philosophical Society in 1965.

His main contribution to the study of the Soviet Union was the development and implementation of a method for the calculation of national output and economic growth in the absence of market valuation. The calculation is based on factor price. In 1960 Bergson (wrongly) predicted that the USSR would overtake the US economically by the 1980s. He was elected to the United States National Academy of Sciences in 1980.

Literary works 
 1938. "A Reformulation of Certain Aspects of Welfare Economics," 1938. Quarterly Journal of Economics, 52(2), pp. 310-334. 
 1954. "On the Concept of Social Welfare," Quarterly Journal of Economics, 68(2), pp.  233-252.
 Structure of Soviet Wages, 1944
 Soviet National Income and Product in 1937, 1950
 Essays in Normative Economics, 1966

References

 M. Ellman, "Bergson, Abram," 1987,  The New Palgrave: A Dictionary of Economics," v. 1'', 229-30

External links 
 https://web.archive.org/web/20060619182023/http://cepa.newschool.edu/het/profiles/bergson.htm
 http://cruel.org/econthought/profiles/bergson.html 
Paul A. Samuelson, "Abram Bergson", Biographical Memoirs of the National Academy of Sciences (2004)

1914 births
2003 deaths
Fellows of the American Academy of Arts and Sciences
Fellows of the Econometric Society
20th-century American economists
Columbia University faculty
Harvard University faculty
Harvard University alumni
Johns Hopkins University alumni
Distinguished Fellows of the American Economic Association

Members of the American Philosophical Society